Usaukpan was the chief queen consort of King Saw Lu of Pagan (Bagan). She was the paternal grandmother of King Sithu I. The queen died soon after Lu's accession to the Pagan throne, and was succeeded by Manisanda as the chief queen (usaukpan).

References

Bibliography
 

Chief queens consort of Pagan
Year of birth unknown
1070s deaths
11th-century Burmese women